Fire services in the York Region of Canada are provided for and by each municipality. There are 35 fire stations across the region. Most services consist of full-time members, but some services have volunteer firefighters.

The departments in south York Region deal mostly with residential and commercial incidents. The northern departments deal with rural, residential and agricultural fire needs.

History

Fire departments in York Region date back to the 19th century, and all were volunteer units. Later in the 20th century full-time fire departments were created. Some departments in the region still retain volunteer units. East Gwillimbury Fire was the last all-volunteer service in the region until 2008, when the first crew of career firefighters was hired. East Gwillimbury and Georgina still have some volunteer stations, but the Township of King is the only department which remains as an all-volunteer department, with a staff of 105 volunteers servicing King City, Nobelton and Schomberg.

Small local departments slowly merged to form large departments in the 1960s and 1970s. In 2001, York Region was planning to merge all fire services in the region into one large unit. Resistance from firefighters and others prevented the plan from being implemented. This was attempted again in 2013 also with no outcome.

The use of "Fire Department" gave way to "Fire and Emergency" as the firefighters' roles expanded in the 1990s.

Command

Each department has their own Chief and senior officers (Deputy Chiefs). The command structure is for the most part similar in the fire services across the region:

Markham
 Chief
 Deputy Chief (2)

King
 Chief and Community Emergency Management Coordinator
 Deputy Chief and alternate Community Emergency Management Coordinator

Central York
 Chief
 Deputy Chief, Operations
 Deputy Chief, Support Services
 Assistant Deputy Chief, Training and Emergency Management

East Gwillimbury
 Chief
 Deputy Chief (1)

Georgina
 Chief
 Deputy Chief and Community Emergency Management Coordinator

Richmond Hill
 Chief
 Deputy Chief (2)

Vaughan
 Chief
 Deputy Chief (3)
 Assistant Deputy Chief (1)

Whitchurch-Stouffville
 Chief
 Deputy Chief (1)

Rank
 Fire Chief
 Deputy Chief
 Assistant Deputy Chief
 Platoon Chief
 Chief Fire Prevention Officer
 Chief Training Officer
 Chief Mechanical Officer
 District Chief
 Captain / Company Officer
 Communications Supervisor
 Communications Operator
 Training Officer
 Fire Prevention Officer
 Firefighter
 Fire Inspector
 Volunteer Firefighter
 Recruit Firefighter
 Administrative Assistant

Operations
Even though Bradford West Gwillimbury is not part of York Region, Bradford West Gwillimbury Fire and Emergency Services uses the same numbering system for its apparatus (I.E.: Station 1 is numbered as 10-1)

Georgina

Town of Georgina Fire and Rescue provides fire fighting services to the communities of Keswick, Ontario, Sutton, Ontario and Pefferlaw, Ontario. The department deals mainly with rural fire situations (residential, commercial and agriculture fires), but it has marine and hazmat capabilities. Georgina Fire and Rescue has a mix of full-time and volunteer staff with total strength of 90 personnel. A fleet of 11 apparatus are spread across 3 stations. Georgina Fire and Rescue was created from the merger of several local fire departments including Keswick Fire Department and Georgina Fire Department.

Georgina Fire Rescue launched a 34' Stanley Aluminium Fire and Rescue Boat in May 2020.  At the time they are the only service with true firefighting capability (SCBA, Hose, Nozzles, etc) for operating on the south shore of the Lake.  The Fireboat is designated as Marine 2.  Marine 1 is the Georgina Fire Rescue Airboat utilized for Lake Rescue during the ice and winter season.  The service is supported by York Regional Police in marine firefighting on Lake Simcoe by use of MU2 Naawig, a patrol boat equipped with a water nozzle.

East Gwillimbury

East Gwillimbury Emergency Services serves the communities of Holland Landing, Ontario, Mount Albert, Ontario and Queensville, Ontario. The department has a full-time fire chief, fire prevention officer and training officer. In addition six full-time firefighters are on duty in two shifts during daytime hours in the Queensville firehall. All other firefighters are volunteers and each station has a staff of 27 and all must be residents of the Town of East Gwillimbury. The fire service is capable of handling a variety of situations, but it is mostly a rural fire service. This fire department responds to approximately 1000 emergency calls each year. Expected growth to East Gwillimbury will result in massive changes to the town's population and the change from a part-time paid on-call fire department to full-time staffed 24 hours in the near future. The service began as independent fire stations in 1970 and unified after 1997.

King Township

King Township Fire & Emergency Services serves the communities of King City, Nobleton, and Schomberg. It serves an area of 333 square kilometres and a population of about 28,000 residents. The service is composed of volunteer fire fighters.

Central York Fire Services

Central York Fire Services provides fire services to both the Town of Newmarket and the Town of Aurora. It has 96 firefighters, 24 Captains and 4 Platoon Chiefs on staff at four fire stations. The fire service was created from the amalgamation of the former Town of Newmarket Fire Department and Town of Aurora Fire Department in 2002. The service has 15 vehicles of which 12 are fire fighting ones.

Whitchurch–Stouffville

Whitchurch-Stouffville Fire Department provides fire fighting services to Whitchurch–Stouffville.  The services protects 38,000 residents with 24 full-time fire suppression staff, 2 full-time fire prevention Officers, training officer and a full-time administrative assistant. There are also 50 volunteer firefighters. The service has 10 vehicles in their fleet.

City of Vaughan

Vaughan Fire and Rescue Service provides fire and emergency needs to the communities in the City of Vaughan (Maple, Ontario, Kleinburg, Ontario, Concord, Ontario, Thornhill, Ontario west of Yonge Street and Woodbridge, Ontario). There are over 250 firefighters on staff all are full-time. The city did have volunteers in Woodbridge Station 7-3 and Kleinburg Station 7-4.  Station 7-3 disbanded its volunteers in the early 2000s with the remainder of the volunteers being disbanded in 2013 with the closure of Station 7-4 in Kleinburg.  The service deals with rural scenarios in the north / northwest and urban in the south part of the city.

Richmond Hill

Richmond Hill Fire & Emergency Services provides fire services to the Town of Richmond Hill. It has 140 fire fighters on staff at 6 fire stations. Richmond Hill also offers specialized technical rescue services including water and ice rescue, technical rope rescue, confined space rescue, trench rescue and hazardous materials response. Richmond Hill provides dispatch services to Georgina, East Gwillimbury, Central York, Whitchurch/Stouffville and Richmond Hill.

Markham

Markham Fire has 200 firefighters on staff and is responsible for fire support for the City of Markham, as well as Toronto/Buttonville Municipal Airport. The newest station is 9-9, which opened in February 2012. The service began as the Markham Village Fire Department (c. 1870s) and acquired Unionville Fire Department in 1964. The Markham Fire Department was created in 1970 and renamed with the current name in 2000. Volunteer fire members were disbanded in 1996.

Markham Fire and Emergency Services provides fire protection to the following communities in the City of Markham:

 Unionville, Ontario
 Cornell, Ontario
 Cachet, Ontario
 Milliken, Ontario
 Armadale, Ontario
 Dickson Hill, Ontario
 Buttonville, Ontario
 Thornhill, Ontario

Fire Chiefs
 Myrl Smith 1970-1985
 Ken Beckett 1985-1996 - now Fire Chief in East Gwillimbury
 Tony Mintoff 1996-1999
 Bob Myles 1999 - acting Chief
 Shayne Mintz 1999 - acting Chief
 Don McClean 1999-2010 - career firefighter left department to complete law studies at Osgoode Law School
 Bill Snowball 2010-2016
 Dave Decker 2016-2020
 Adam Grant 2020-

Georgina Island

Fire services on Fox Island, Georgina Island and Snake Island are provided by Georgina Island Fire Department under the Chippewas of Georgina Island First Nation. The department has two full time firefighters and numerous trained volunteers.

Fire stations and apparatus

York Region's fire apparatus use fire engine red as the base colour. Trim varies from yellow, white and blue.

Markham and Vaughan were one of a number of municipalities to have formerly used a yellow paint scheme.

APPARATUS DESIGNATIONS - The numbering works like this:
The first digit is the municipality
The second digit is the station number
The third digit is the apparatus number
1 - Engine (Pumper)
2 - Engine (Pumper)
3 - Squirt (Telescoping boom)
4 - Tanker
5 - Tanker
6 - Aerial (Ladder)
7 - Aerial Platform
8 - Haz-Mat
9 - Rescue or Rescue Pumper
0 - Utility

The apparatus numbers are pronounced by saying each digit individually. For example, 729 would be pronounced Seven-Two-Nine, NOT Seven Twenty Nine, and 849 would be pronounced Eight-Four-Nine, NOT Eight Forty Nine, and so on.

For units with 4 digits, such as Fire Prevention, Training, and spare apparatus, the last 3 digits are pronounced individually from the first digit. For example, 4401 would be pronounced Four-Four-Zero-One, NOT Forty-Four-O-One.

GEORGINA FIRE DEPARTMENT
141 - 1999 International / Fort Garry pumper
144 - 2018 Spartan Metro Star / Metalfab pumper tanker
147 - 2019 HME Ahrens-Fox 104' platform quint
149 - 2022 Spartan Metro Star / Dependable rescue pumper
140 - Dodge Ram 2500 4x4
164 - 2016 Spartan Metro Star / Dependable pumper tanker
166 - 2011 Spartan Metro Star / Crimson 75' quint
169 - 2017 Spartan Metro Star / Dependable rescue pumper
160 - Dodge Ram 2500 4x4
181 - 2011 Spartan Force / Crimson pumper
182 - 2002 Freightliner / Almonte pumper
184 - 2022 Spartan Metro Star / Dependable pumper tanker
185 - 2003 GMC / Almonte tanker
Marine 1 - 1990 Husky Air Boat Marine Rescue
Marine 2 - 2020 Stanley Boats
Command 10 - HazMat/Emergency Operations Unit - Wells Cargo 24’ Trailer
1401 - 2007 Dodge Caravan - Fire Prevention Officer
1402 - 2005 Dodge Caravan - Fire Prevention Officer

Georgina Island Fire Department
Although not part of the York Region's fire services, the Chippewas of Georgina Island First Nation has their own fire and rescue capability.
 191 - 2005 Fort Garry/Sterling Acterra pumper
 194 - 2009 Fort Garry/Sterling Acterra tanker

EAST GWILLIMBURY EMERGENCY SERVICES
244 - 2011 Spartan Metro Star / Rosenbauer pumper-tanker
246 - 2018 HME Ahrens-Fox 111' quint
249 - 2016 Freightliner M2 / Dependable rescue pumper
261 - 2014 Spartan ERV Metro Star pumper
264 - 2015 Spartan Gladiator Dependable pumper-tanker
269 - 2016 Freightliner M2 / Dependable rescue pumper
281 - 2008 Spartan Advantage / Rosenbauer engine
284 - 2015 Spartan Metro Star Dependable pumper-tanker
286 - 2003 Freightliner FL80 / Rosenbauer 65' aerial

KING TOWNSHIP FIRE & EMERGENCY SERVICES
341 - 2018 Spartan Metro Star / Dependable pumper
344 - 2017 Kenworth / Dependable tanker
345 - 2009 Kenworth / Dependable tanker
346 - 2011 Spartan Gladiator Classic / Crimson 100' quint (purchased in 2013)
349 - 2001 Spartan Advantage / Dependable rescue pumper (2016 refurb)
340 - 2012 Ford F350 Super Duty - Utility
3401 - 2006 Ford Fusion - Fire Prevention
3402 - 2016 Chevrolet Equinox - Fire Prevention
CH31 - 2017 Chevrolet Silverado 1500 LT - Chief
CH32 - 2017 Chevrolet Silverado 1500 LT - Deputy Chief
360 - 2020 Chevrolet Silverado 2500 HD Utility
361 - 2004 American LaFrance pumper
362 - 1969 Ford/LaFrance pumper (Retired-Parade/Training Unit)
366 - 2018 HME Ahrens-Fox 80' quint
364 - 2017 Kenworth/ Dependable tanker
365 - 2002 Freightliner/Dependable tanker
369 - 2001 Spartan / Dependable rescue pumper
Command 30 - 2019 Freightliner / Dependable rehab command unit
 1929 International/Bickle Antique Engine (Retired Parade Unit)(Original Schomberg Unit)
 1940 Ford Antique Engine (Retired Parade Unit)
381 - 2007 Ferrara Inferno
382 - 2001 Spartan Advantage / Dependable Rescue Pumper
384 - 2009 Kenworth Tanker / Dependable
389 - 2009 Dependable Heavy Rescue
380 - 2019 Chevrolet Silverado 2500HD Utility 

CENTRAL YORK FIRE SERVICES
CH44 - 2017 Ford Expedition command vehicle
CH45 - 2012 Ford Expedition command vehicle
U410 - 2016 Ford F-350 pick-up
E411 - 2019 Spartan Metro Star / Dependable rescue pumper
E412 - 2012 Spartan Gladiator / Crimson rescue pumper
E421 - 2019 Spartan Metro Star / Dependable rescue pumper
E422 - 2005 American LaFrance Eagle rescue pumper
P427 - 2013 Spartan Gladiator / Smeal 100' platform-quint
E431 - 2014 Spartan ERV Gladiator rescue pumper
E432 - 2006 American LaFrance Eagle rescue pumper
A436 - 2012 Spartan Gladiator / Smeal 105' quint
H438 - 1999 Freightliner Rescue / Hazardous Material Response Unit
E442 - 2009 Spartan Metro Star / Smeal pumper
T444 - 2012 Spartan Gladiator / Smeal pumper-tanker
A446 - 2017 Spartan Metro Star / Smeal 55' quint
1931 Bickle Antique Fire Engine - Historic Unit
1926 International Lorne Engine - Historic Unit

WHITCHURCH-STOUFFVILLE FIRE & EMERGENCY SERVICES
511 - 2017 Spartan Metro Star / Smeal rescue pumper
514 - 2008 Spartan Metro Star / Seagrave pumper-tanker
517 - 2016 Spartan ERV Gladiator 100' platform quint
519 - 2009 Spartan Metro Star / Seagrave heavy rescue
521 - 2008 Spartan Metro Star / Seagrave rescue pumper
522 - 2007 Spartan Metro Star / Seagrave rescue pumper
524 - 2004 Freightliner M2 / Superior pumper-tanker
525 - 2011 Freightliner / Asphodel tanker

VAUGHAN FIRE & RESCUE SERVICE
Chief 7-3 - District Chief
Chief 7-4 - Platoon Chief
711 - 2011 Spartan Gladiator / Smeal pumper
716 - 2017 Spartan Gladiator / Smeal 105' quint
721 - 2019 Spartan Metro Star / Smeal rescue pumper
729 - 2014 Spartan Metro Star / SVI heavy rescue
720 - 2011 Ford utility truck
731 - 2014 Spartan Metro Star / Smeal rescue pumper
737 - 2009 Spartan Gladiator / Smeal 100' platform quint
738 - 2018 Spartan Metro Star / SVI haz-mat unit
741 - 2014 Spartan Metro Star / Smeal rescue pumper
758 - 2005 Freightliner M2 / Dependable technical rescue
759 - 2019 Spartan Metro Star / Smeal rescue pumper
766 - 2019 Spartan Metro Star / Smeal 55' quint
771 - 2019 Spartan Metro Star / Smeal rescue pumper
774 - 2004 Peterbilt 330 / Danko tanker
786 - 2019 Spartan Metro Star / Smeal 55' quint
791 - 2006 Spartan Advantage / Smeal pumper
710-1 - 2011 Spartan Gladiator Classic / Smeal pumper
701

RICHMOND HILL FIRE & EMERGENCY SERVICES
Command 8-0 (Command Post) 1999 Motor Coach
Command 8-3 (Platoon Chief)- 2019 Ford F-150
811 - 2015 Spartan ERV Gladiator rescue pumper
819 - 2006 Spartan Gladiator / Dependable technical heavy rescue
821 - 2014 Spartan ERV Gladiator rescue pumper
824 - 2004 Freightliner / Dependable tanker
829 - 1992 Ford Super Duty - Water Rescue Unit (Zodiac Boat Trailer)
836 - 2017 Ferrara Inferno 107' quint
841 - 2014 Spartan ERV Gladiator rescue pumper
844 - 2013 International / Spartan ERV pumper-tanker
848 - 2018 Freightliner / Maxi Metal haz-mat unit
851 - 2015 Spartan ERV Gladiator rescue pumper
861 - 2019 Spartan ERV Gladiator rescue pumper
864 - 2004 Freightliner / Dependable tanker

MARKHAM FIRE & EMERGENCY SERVICES
CH96 - District Chief
CH97 - District Chief
911 - 2014 Spartan Metro Star / Smeal pumper
916 - 2014 Spartan Gladiator Classic / Smeal 105' quint
920 - 2009 Freightliner M2 / Dependable air/light unit
921 - 2017 Spartan Metro Star / Smeal pumper
928 - Hazmat Trailer
931 - 2010 Spartan Gladiator / Smeal pumper
941 - 2019 Spartan Metro Star / Smeal pumper
950 - Utility Vehicle
951 - 2010 Spartan Gladiator / Smeal pumper
954 - 2015 International / Danko tanker
957 - 2015 Spartan Gladiator / Smeal 100' platform quint
961 - 2014 Spartan Metro Star / Smeal pumper
971 - 2014 Spartan Metro Star / Smeal pumper
981 - 2015 Spartan Metro Star / Smeal pumper
991 - 2012 Spartan Metro Star / Smeal pumper

See also
 York Region Paramedic Services 
 York Regional Police

References

External links
 Aurora / Newmarket - Central York Fire Services
 East Gwillimbury Fire
 Georgina Fire
 Markham Fire
 Richmond Hill Fire
 Vaughan Fire
 Whitchurch-Stouffville Fire Department

Regional Municipality of York
Fire departments in Ontario